Gloiocephala is a genus of fungi in the family Physalacriaceae.  The genus is widespread, though mainly known from tropical and sub-tropical areas, and contains about 30 species.

The mushrooms of this group are very small and grow on stems and leaves of monocotyledonous plants, such as sedges, usually in wet places.  In most species their fruiting bodies do not develop into a typical mushroom form - the  gills are often reduced to vein-like structures or completely missing, and the stipe may be asymmetrical, short or absent.

There are five species which grow in Europe: G. caricis, G. cerkesii, G. cornelii, G. menieri and G. pseudocaricis.

Species

Gloiocephala allomorpha
Gloiocephala alvaradoi
Gloiocephala amphibia
Gloiocephala anastomosans
Gloiocephala aquatica
Gloiocephala capillata
Gloiocephala caricis
Gloiocephala cerkezii
Gloiocephala ciliata
Gloiocephala cinnamomea
Gloiocephala confusa
Gloiocephala cornelii
Gloiocephala culmicola
Gloiocephala epiphylla
Gloiocephala gracilis
Gloiocephala helisca
Gloiocephala inobasis
Gloiocephala lamellosa
Gloiocephala longicrinita
Gloiocephala longifimbriata
Gloiocephala longisperma
Gloiocephala lutea
Gloiocephala menieri
Gloiocephala mucrocystidiata
Gloiocephala mycenoides
Gloiocephala nothofagi
Gloiocephala occidentalis
Gloiocephala palmarum
Gloiocephala phormiorum
Gloiocephala podocarporum
Gloiocephala pseudocaricis
Gloiocephala quercetorum
Gloiocephala quitensis
Gloiocephala religiosa
Gloiocephala resinopunctata
Gloiocephala rubescens
Gloiocephala sessilis
Gloiocephala spathularia
Gloiocephala tenuicrinita
Gloiocephala tezae
Gloiocephala tibiicystis
Gloiocephala xanthocephala
Gloiocephala zeylanica

References

Physalacriaceae